Bouea oppositifolia, also known as plum mango, kundang, kundangan or remenia, is a species of flowering plant, a fruit tree in the mango family, that is native to Indochina and Southeast Asia.

Description
The tree grows to 10–20 m in height with a short, low-branching bole and a dense rounded canopy. The oval leaves are smooth and leathery, 3–15 cm long by 1.5–5 cm wide. The inflorescences comprise clusters of small, white to pale yellow flowers at the leaf axils. The fruits are round to ovoid drupes 1.5–2.5 cm long by 1–2.5 cm wide, turning from yellow to orange or red when ripe. The seed is a 1–1.5 cm stone with a fibrous endocarp  and violet-purple cotyledons.

Distribution and habitat
The species occurs from Myanmar and Indochina to the Malay Peninsula, Sumatra, Borneo and Sulawesi, where it is found in lowland mixed dipterocarp, coastal and peatswamp forests up to an elevation of 700 m. It is also widely cultivated.

References

 
oppositifolia
Flora of Indo-China
Flora of Malesia
Trees of Southeast Asia
Fruits originating in Asia
Plants described in 1824
Taxa named by William Roxburgh